Chapultepec Uno R509, previously Punto Chapultepec, is a skyscraper in Mexico City at the corner of Paseo de la Reforma and Río Ródano street, immediately west of Torre Mayor. Chapultepec Uno is Mexico City's third tallest building upon completion at 241m and 58 stories high. Part of the tower will be occupied by The Ritz Carlton Mexico City which is expected to open in Autumn 2021.

Previous buildings on site 
In 2005 there was a project to remodel the existing towers on the lot, Torre Reforma 509 and Torre Reforma 506, but it was not successful. In 2009, Serrano Arquitectos planned to build a skyscraper 303m and 69 floors high but in 2010 the project was cancelled in favor of a shorter tower.

See also
List of tallest buildings in Mexico City

References

External links 
 
 Chapultepec Uno R509 official website
 The Ritz Carlton, Mexico City official website
 Page on edemx.com

Skyscrapers in Mexico City
Buildings and structures under construction in Mexico
Cuauhtémoc, Mexico City
Paseo de la Reforma